Lavrenti is a masculine given name. 

Notable persons:
 Lavrenti Lopes, Indian actor and former model in Hollywood
 Lavrenti Son, Koryo-saram playwright and author of short stories
 Lavrenti Ardaziani, Georgian writer and journalist

See also 
 Lavrente Calinov, Romanian sprint canoer
 Lavrentiy (given name)
 Lavrentis (name)
 Laurentius (disambiguation)